The Lincoln Tomb is the final resting place of Abraham Lincoln, the 16th President of the United States; his wife Mary Todd Lincoln; and three of their four sons: Edward, William, and Thomas. It is located in Oak Ridge Cemetery in Springfield, Illinois. It is constructed of granite and has a large, single-story rectangular base surmounted by an obelisk, with a semicircular receiving room entranceway on one end and a semicircular crypt or burial-room opposite.

Four flights of balustraded stairs lead to a level terrace. The balustrade extends around the terrace to form a parapet, and there are several statues located at the base of the obelisk. The obelisk rises 117 feet (36m) high.

A bronze recasting of Gutzon Borglum's head of Lincoln stands on a pedestal in front of the entrance way; the original head of Lincoln is in the U.S. Capitol. Inside the ground level entrance is a rotunda with connecting hallways to the burial room.  Marble is used throughout the interior, and several specially cast statues of Lincoln are displayed.  A stained glass window and flags adorn the crypt, which is centered around a red marble monument.

At the close of the ceremonies and events marking Lincoln's death, his body was placed in a nearby receiving tomb and later in the state tomb. The mausoleum is owned and administered by the State of Illinois as Lincoln Tomb State Historic Site. It was designated one of the first National Historic Landmarks in 1960, and thus became one of the first sites listed on the National Register of Historic Places in 1966, when that designation was created.

History
On April 15, 1865, the day after President Lincoln died, a group of Springfield citizens formed the National Lincoln Monument Association and spearheaded a drive for funds to construct a memorial or tomb. Upon arrival of the funeral train on May 3, Lincoln lay in state in the Illinois State Capitol for one night.  After funeral and burial services the next day, his coffin was placed in a receiving vault at Oak Ridge Cemetery, the site Mrs. Lincoln requested for burial. In December, her husband's remains were removed to a temporary vault not far from the proposed memorial site.  The location of the temporary vault is today marked with a small granite marker on the hill behind the current tomb.  In 1871, three years after laborers had begun constructing the tomb, the body of Lincoln and those of the three youngest of his sons were placed in crypts in the unfinished structure.

In 1874, upon completion of the memorial, which had been designed by Larkin Goldsmith Mead, Lincoln's remains were interred in a marble sarcophagus in the center of a chamber known as the "catacombs," or burial room. In 1876, however, after two Chicago criminals failed in an attempt to steal Lincoln's body and hold it for ransom, the National Lincoln Monument Association hid it in another part of the memorial,  first under wood and other debris and then buried in the ground within the tomb.  When Mrs. Lincoln died in 1882, her remains were placed with those of Lincoln, but in 1887 both bodies were reburied in a brick vault beneath the floor of the burial room.

By 1895, the year the State acquired the memorial, it had fallen into disrepair. During a rebuilding and restoration program from 1899–1901, all five caskets were moved to a nearby subterranean vault. Following completion of the restoration, State officials returned them to the burial room and placed that of Lincoln in the sarcophagus it had occupied in 1874–1876. In 1930–31 the State reconstructed the interior of the memorial in an Art Deco style. Rededicated in the later year by President Herbert Hoover, it has undergone little change since that time.

The Lincoln Tomb was designated a National Historic Landmark on December 19, 1960, and listed on the National Register of Historic Places on October 15, 1980.

Design and layout

The tomb is in the center of a 12½ acre (51,000 m²) plot. Constructed of granite from Biddeford, Maine, dressed at Quincy, Massachusetts, it has a rectangular base surmounted by a -high obelisk and a semicircular entranceway. A bronze reproduction by sculptor Gutzon Borglum of his head of Lincoln in the U.S. Capitol rests on a pedestal in front of the entranceway. Four flights of balustraded stairs—two flanking the entrance at the front and two at the rear—lead to a level terrace. The balustrade extends around the terrace to form a parapet.  Originally open to the public, the terrace has since been closed due to safety concerns.

In the center of the terrace, a large and ornate base supports the obelisk.  On the walls of the base are 40 hewn stones, cut to represent raised shields, 37 are engraved with the abbreviation of a State at the time the tomb was built. The remaining 3 are marked U, S, A. Each shield is connected to another by two raised bands, and thus the group forms an unbroken chain encircling the base. Four bronze statues adorn the corners of the latter. They represent the infantry, navy, artillery, and cavalry of the Civil War period. In front of the obelisk and above the entrance stands a full-length statue of Lincoln.  The tomb's design architect and sculptor, Larkin G. Mead, designed and executed these carvings and statues.

The interior of the memorial, constructed of marble from Minnesota, Missouri, Massachusetts, Arkansas, Utah, Italy, Spain, France, and Belgium, contains a rotunda, a burial room, and connecting corridors. A down-scaled bronze prototype by Daniel Chester French of his 1920 statue in the Lincoln Memorial, in Washington, D.C., dominates the entrance foyer. The walls of the rotunda are decorated with 16 marble pilasters, which are separated by marble panels. The pilasters symbolize Lincoln and the 15 Presidents who preceded him. The room also contains 36 bronze panels, one for each state at the time of Lincoln's death. The ceiling is of palladium leaf.

Corridors lead from the rotunda to the burial room at the rear of the memorial. Located in niches along the corridor walls are eight statues by prominent sculptors depicting various phases of Lincoln's life. Four bronze tablets on the walls are engraved with the Farewell Address, the Gettysburg Address, a portion of the Second Inaugural Address, and a biographical sketch. Large gold stars in sets of 12 at each corner of the memorial represent the 48 states in the Union at the time of its 1930 redecoration.

The burial room features black and white marble walls and a ceiling of gold leaf. At its center stands the memorial monument, a 7-ton block of reddish marble inscribed with Lincoln's name and the years he lived. It marks the approximate location of the burial vault, which is 30 inches behind and 10 feet below. Nine flags are arranged in a semicircle around the cenotaph. Seven of them—the State flags of Massachusetts, New Jersey, Pennsylvania, Virginia, Kentucky, Indiana, and Illinois—commemorate the homes of Lincoln and his ancestors. The eighth and ninth are the U.S. Flag and the Presidential flag. The inscription "Now he belongs to the ages," reputedly spoken by Secretary of War Edwin M. Stanton at the time of Lincoln's death, is inscribed in the wall above a stained glass window. Along the south wall of the burial room are four crypts containing the remains of Mrs. Lincoln and three of Lincoln's four sons, Edward, Willie, and Tad (the eldest, Robert Todd Lincoln, is buried at Arlington National Cemetery, alongside his wife and son).

The tomb was built with additional crypts for members of Lincoln's family in addition to the four spaces already used. However, as the remaining members of Lincoln's family chose to be buried elsewhere, the other crypts remain empty.

Adjacent memorials
Also part of the site overseen by the State of Illinois, and a short distance from the tomb, three war memorials have been erected:
 The World War II Illinois Veterans Memorial was dedicated in December 2004.  This memorial honors the 987,000 Illinois men and women who served in World War II and the 22,000 who gave their lives.  Its focal point is a white 22-ton concrete globe flanked on two sides by black granite walls.  Stainless steel buttons on the globe identify major battles, and quotations from military leaders, and Presidents Franklin D. Roosevelt and Harry S. Truman are engraved on the wall.
 The Korean War Memorial honors 1,748 Illinoisans killed during the 1950-53 Korean War.  This memorial was dedicated on June 16, 1996.  The memorial consists of a twelve-foot-tall bronze bell, with a diameter of twelve feet, mounted on a granite base.  At the circumference of the bell are four niches, each with a larger-than-life figure representing a branch of the armed services.  Inscribed on the base are the names of Illinoisans killed in Korea.  A carillon system in the Memorial plays brief musical programs at regular intervals.
 The Vietnam Veterans Memorial honors the almost 3,000 Illinoisans killed during the Vietnam War, and was dedicated in 1988. The memorial has a circular layout allowing visitors to enter the interior courtyard from any direction. The names of those killed or missing in action are on five granite slabs, each slab representing one of the branches of the United States Military.

See also
 Fleetwood Lindley, the last living person to have seen Abraham Lincoln's face, in 1901 during renovation of the tomb. He was 14 years old at the time.
 Presidential memorials in the United States

References

 Information taken from a National Park Service website.

External links

 Lincoln Tomb State Historic Site
 National Historic Landmark information

Buildings and structures completed in 1874
Tomb
National Historic Landmarks in Illinois
Obelisks in the United States
Illinois in the American Civil War
Assassination of Abraham Lincoln
Statues of Abraham Lincoln
Illinois State Historic Sites
Monuments and memorials on the National Register of Historic Places in Illinois
Tombs of presidents of the United States
National Register of Historic Places in Springfield, Illinois
Tourist attractions in Springfield, Illinois
Abraham Lincoln National Heritage Area
Tombs in the United States
Monuments and memorials to Abraham Lincoln in the United States
Mausoleums on the National Register of Historic Places
1874 establishments in Illinois
1865 establishments in Illinois

de:Oak Ridge Cemetery#Abraham Lincolns Grab